KWSA (100.1 FM) is a radio station broadcasting an adult hits format. Licensed to Price, Utah, United States, the station is currently owned by Jeff Wood and Against the Wind Broadcasting, Inc. and features programming from ABC Radio.

History
The station went on the air as KPRQ on July 10, 1985. On June 21, 2002, the station changed its call sign to the current KWSA.

On January 1, 2020, KWSA flipped from Adult Contemporary to Adult Hits and rebranded as, 100.1 Jack FM.

References

External links

WSA
Radio stations established in 1985
1985 establishments in Utah
Adult hits radio stations in the United States